Robert Clatworthy (December 31, 1911 – March 2, 1992) was an American art director. He won an Academy Award and was nominated four more times in the category Best Art Direction.

Selected filmography
Clatworthy won an Academy Award for Best Art Direction and was nominated for four more:

Won
 Ship of Fools (1965)

Nominated
 Psycho (1960)
 That Touch of Mink (1962)
 Inside Daisy Clover (1965)
 Guess Who's Coming to Dinner (1967)

References

External links

1911 births
1992 deaths
American art directors
Best Art Direction Academy Award winners
People from Illinois